The Blue Dragon Film Awards is an annual awards ceremony that is presented by Sports Chosun (a sister brand of the Chosun Ilbo) for excellence in film in South Korea.

The Blue Dragon Film Awards considers only blockbusters and popular movies of high artistic value released during the previous year. During the selection process, about forty movies that have made it to the final list are screened to the public for free. After the screening of each selection, the awards ceremony opens.

The Blue Dragon Film Awards and Grand Bell Awards are the most popular film awards in South Korea.

History 
It was created in 1963 by The Chosun Ilbo newspaper and discontinued in 1973. Sports Chosun, a Korean sports daily also owned by The Chosun Ilbo, resurrected the ceremony in 1990 and it has been held annually since then.

The 42nd Blue Dragon Film Awards ceremony was held on November 26, 2021 at KBS Hall in Yeouido, Seoul. In this edition, 18 categories were awarded. The nominations for 15 categories were announced for the Korean films released from October 30, 2020 to October 14, 2021 on November 1, 2021.

Current categories 

 Best Film
 Best Director
 Best Actor
 Best Actress
 Best Supporting Actor
 Best Supporting Actress
 Best New Director
 Best New Actor
 Best New Actress
 Best Screenplay
 Best Short Film
 Best Art Direction
 Best Cinematography and Lighting
 Best Editing
 Best Music
 Technical Award

Popular Awards

Popular Star Award

Audience Choice Award for Most Popular Film

Discontinued categories

Notes

References

General references

External links 

  
 

 
South Korean film awards
Awards established in 1963
Annual events in South Korea